The Pallimas Valley Urdu (وادی پلیماس) Sindhi (وادي پلیماس) is a valley in Wadh Tesil, nearby Wadh town of Khuzdar District, Balochistan, a western province of Pakistan.The Kunj and other hill torrents flow from mountainous area towards the valley. The ancient inscriptions and Tharia Cave Paintings have been explored in the vicinity of this valley as well. Maney historical and archaeological sites are located in valley which possibly are the period of Nal Civilisation of Nall, Pakistan

Gallery

References 

Tourism in Pakistan
Valleys of Pakistan